German submarine U-626 was a Type VIIC U-boat of Nazi Germany's Kriegsmarine during World War II. The ship was built by Blohm & Voss of Hamburg, and commissioned on 11 June 1942. After six months of basic training she was assigned to the 6th U-boat Flotilla. U-626 sailed from Bergen on 8 December 1942 on her first operational voyage. She was reported missing on 16 December after failing to report her position.

Design
German Type VIIC submarines were preceded by the shorter Type VIIB submarines. U-626 had a displacement of  when at the surface and  while submerged. She had two shafts and two  propellers.

U-626 was fitted with five  torpedo tubes (four fitted at the bow and one at the stern), fourteen torpedoes, one  SK C/35 naval gun, 220 rounds, and a  C/30 anti-aircraft gun. The boat had a complement of between 44 and 60.

Service history

U-626 was assigned to the 5th U-boat Flotilla for basic training, and upon completion was permanently assigned to the 5th U-boat Flotilla. On 8 December 1942, U-626, under the direction of Leutnant zur See (acting sub-lieutenant/ensign) Hans-Botho Bade left Bergen, Norway for her maiden patrol. On 14 December 1942, U-626 sent her final radio message at position  and was never heard from again. 47 men were lost with her.

Previously recorded fate
U-626 was previously thought to have been sunk in the North Atlantic on 15 December 1942 by depth charges from US Coast Guard cutter USCGC Ingham. This attack was actually 200 nmi from U-626's position and there is no evidence that the target was a U-boat.

References

Bibliography

External links
 

German Type VIIC submarines
U0626 (1940)
U-boats commissioned in 1942
U-boats sunk in 1942
1942 ships
Missing U-boats of World War II
World War II shipwrecks in the Atlantic Ocean
Ships built in Hamburg
U-boats sunk by depth charges
U-boats sunk by US warships
U-boat accidents
Maritime incidents in September 1942
Maritime incidents in December 1942